The Dutch Eerste Divisie in the 1971–72 season was contested by 21 teams, five more than in the previous year. Due to the disbandment of the Tweede Divisie, six teams were promoted to the Eerste Divisie; the rest of the teams returned to amateur football. As a result of the disbandment, teams no longer could relegate to lower leagues. HFC Haarlem won the championship.

New entrants
Promoted from the 1970–71 Tweede Divisie:
 FC Eindhoven
 Fortuna Vlaardingen
 PEC Zwolle
 Roda JC
 De Volewijckers
 VVV-Venlo
Relegated from the 1970–71 Eredivisie:
 AZ'67
 HFC Haarlem

League standings

See also
 1971–72 Eredivisie
 1971–72 KNVB Cup

References

Netherlands - List of final tables (RSSSF)

Eerste Divisie seasons
2
Neth